Testosterone propionate/testosterone enanthate/testosterone undecylenate (TP/TE/TUe), sold under the brand name Durasteron, is an injectable combination medication of testosterone propionate (TP), testosterone valerate (TV), and testosterone undecylenate (TUe), all of which are androgens/anabolic steroids. It contains 20 mg TP, 80 mg TE, and 150 mg TUe (for a total of 250 mg testosterone ester and 169.5 mg free testosterone) in oil solution and is administered by intramuscular injection at regular intervals, for instance once every 3 or 4 weeks. Use of Durasteron by bodybuilders has been reported.

See also 
 Testosterone propionate/testosterone valerate/testosterone undecylenate
 List of combined sex-hormonal preparations § Androgens

References 

Abandoned drugs
Combined androgen formulations